Almost Persuaded is the tenth studio album released by jazz/pop duo Swing Out Sister. It was produced by band member Andy Connell. It is the culmination of "Moveable Feast", a PledgeMusic project that had been running for several years. In 2015, the band had released Rushes, an in-progress version of the album. Almost Persuaded was released via direct MP3 download in November 2017 and then via autographed CD to those had pledged to the project in December 2017. The album was released on 22 June 2018.

A CD version of the album without vocals was available at the band's gig at Islington Assembly Hall on 13 November 2018.

Track listing
All songs written by Andy Connell and Corinne Drewery except where noted

Digital/CD version
"Don't Give the Game Away" – 4:05
"Happier Than Sunshine" – 4:21
"Almost Persuaded" – 3:48
"Which Wrong Is Right?" (Connell, Drewery, Foster) – 3:43
"All in a Heartbeat (Late Night Version)" – 3:08
"Until Tomorrow Forgets" (Connell, Drewery, Foster) – 4:38
"I Wish I Knew" – 3:48
"Everybody's Here" – 3:40
"All in a Heartbeat" – 4:41
"Something Deep in Your Heart" (Connell, Drewery, Foster) – 3:37
"Be My Valentine" – 2:25
"Something Deep (Reprise)" – 3:43

Japanese bonus tracks

"Never Let Me Go" – 4:06
"Never Let Me Go (Lullaby)" – 0:42

LP version

Side A
"Don't Give the Game Away"
"Happier Than Sunshine"
"Almost Persuaded"
"Which Wrong Is Right?"
"Everybody's Here"

Side B
"Until Tomorrow Forgets"
"I Wish I Knew"
"All In A Heartbeat"
"Something Deep in Your Heart"
"Be My Valentine"

Charts

Weekly charts

Personnel
Corinne Drewery – lead vocals
Andy Connell - Fender bass, keyboards, piano, vibraphone
Ben Castle – bass clarinet, baritone saxophone
Mick Foster – bass clarinet, baritone saxophone
Jody Linscott – congas, percussion
Don Swana – double bass
George Hart – drums
Kate Robertson – flute, saxophone
Pat Clahar – flute, saxophone
Clare Moss – French horn
David Lee – French horn
Tim Cansfield – guitars
Becky Smith – trombone
Pete Beachill – trombone
Lance Kelly – trumpet, flugelhorn
Noel Langley – trumpet, flugelhorn
Yazz Ahmed – trumpet, flugelhorn
Gina Foster – backing vocals

References

2017 albums
Swing Out Sister albums